Dillenidae is a botanical name at the rank of subclass.
Circumscription of the subclass will vary with the taxonomic system being used; the only requirement being that it includes the family Dilleniaceae. A well-known system that uses this name is the Cronquist system, and in the original 1981 version of the system the circumscription was:

 subclass Dilleniidae
 order Dilleniales
 order Theales
 order Malvales
 order Lecythidales
 order Nepenthales
 order Violales
 order Salicales
 order Capparales
 order Batales
 order Ericales
 order Diapensiales
 order Ebenales
 order Primulales

Recent molecular systematic studies have shown that this group is polyphyletic.  The APG II system does not use formal botanical names above the rank of order but assigns the plants involved to various orders in the asterids and rosids clades.

References

Further reading 
 

Historically recognized angiosperm taxa